Thierry Dusserre (born 25 July 1967 in Romans-sur-Isère, Drôme) is a French biathlete.

He was born in Romans-sur-Isère, Drôme. At the 1994 Winter Olympics in Lillehammer, he won a bronze medal with the French relay team, in 4 x 7.5 km relay.

References

External links

1967 births
Living people
People from Romans-sur-Isère
French male biathletes
Olympic biathletes of France
Biathletes at the 1994 Winter Olympics
Biathletes at the 1998 Winter Olympics
Olympic bronze medalists for France
Olympic medalists in biathlon
Biathlon World Championships medalists
Medalists at the 1994 Winter Olympics
Université Savoie-Mont Blanc alumni
Sportspeople from Drôme
20th-century French people